A neuropsychological test used in the diagnosis of Alzheimer’s disease.
The subject gets one of more digits s/he has to cross out from a list of numbers. The resulting score consists of the correctly crossed out numbers minus the incorrectly crossed out numbers.

References
 

Neuropsychological tests